Minerve is a commune in the Hérault department in the Occitanie region in southern France. It is the namesake of the Minervois wine region.

History
In 1210 a group of Cathars sought refuge in the village after the massacre at Béziers during the Albigensian Crusade. The village was besieged by Simon de Montfort, 5th Earl of Leicester. The attacking army besieged the village for six weeks before it surrendered. Four catapults or trebuchets were set up around the ramparts, three to attack the village itself and the largest, known as Malvoisine or "bad neighbour", to destroy the town's well. With the town's only water supply cut off, the Commander of the 200-strong garrison, Viscount Guilhem of Minerve, gave in and negotiated a surrender in order to have the villagers and himself spared from death. However, 140 Cathars refused to give up their faith and convert, being burned to death at the stake on 22 July.

Geography
The village is situated on top of the gorge of the River Cesse in a naturally strong defensive position. Near the village the river disappears underground in a large, naturally carved tunnel.

Pictures

Population

Miscellaneous
Minerve has been selected as one of Les Plus Beaux Villages de France ("The Most Beautiful Villages Of France"). Historically, the village has been the capital of the Minervois wine region.  The main bridge leading into the village is closed to all passenger vehicles not owned by residents of Minerve.  Of all of the original fortifications, only a slender octagonal tower, known locally as the Candela, survives.

See also
 Minervois AOC
Communes of the Hérault department

References

External links

 LanguedocFrance.com description of Minerve

Communes of Hérault
Plus Beaux Villages de France